Naresuan University Hospital is a primary teaching hospital of the Faculty of Medicine Naresuan University, located on the campus of Naresuan University in Phitsanulok Province, Thailand. The hospital is designed as the super tertiary care medical center in the lower northern region of Thailand.

History

After establishment of the Faculty of Medicine Naresuan University in 1994, the Royal Thai Government permitted a budget to build Medical Sciences building and Health Sciences Research Center inside Naresuan University to be a research and a teaching center of students in health sciences field. Besides the education, Health Sciences Research Center was also aimed to be the super tertiary care medical center in this region.

The construction of Health Sciences Research Center Naresuan University was started in 1996 and completed in 2000.

In July, 2000, the university cabinet agreed to rename as "Health Sciences Research Institute Naresuan University" and managed as a faculty of the university.

On December 1, 2003, Princess Maha Chakri Sirindhorn operated the grand opening ceremony of the building and statue of Prince Mahidol Adulyadej of Songkla and the Princess Mother Srinagarindra, the father and mother of Thai public health and modern Thai medicine. The Princess also gave the name of the building as "Sirindhorn Building".

On March 26, 2005, the university cabinet have had a resolution to rename the Health Sciences Research Institute again as "Naresuan University Hospital" and combined as a part of Faculty of Medicine Naresuan University to be the faculty's primary teaching hospital.

The first batch of medical students started the clinical year at Naresuan University Hospital in 2007.

Director

Address

Located inside Naresuan University.
99 Moo 9, Phitsanulok-Nakhon Sawan Road, Tha Pho, Mueang Phitsanulok, Phitsanulok 65000, Thailand

See also

 List of hospitals in Thailand
 Faculty of Medicine, Naresuan University
 Naresuan University

External links
 Naresuan University Hospital
 Faculty of Medicine, Naresuan University

Hospital buildings completed in 2000
Teaching hospitals in Thailand
Hospitals in Thailand
Buildings and structures in Phitsanulok province
Phitsanulok
Hospitals established in 2005
2005 establishments in Thailand